Gsies is a valley and comune (municipality) in South Tyrol in northern Italy, located about  northeast of Bolzano, on the border with Austria. 
Gsies held the FIL World Luge Natural Track Championships 1994.

Geography

Gsies borders the following municipalities: Toblach, Innervillgraten (Austria), Welsberg-Taisten, Rasen-Antholz, Sankt Jakob in Defereggen (Austria), and Niederdorf.

Frazioni
The municipality of Gsies contains the frazioni (subdivisions, mainly villages and hamlets) Außerpichl (Colle di Fuori), Innerpichl (Colle di Dentro), St. Magdalena-Niedertal (Santa Maddalena Valbassa), St. Magdalena-Obertal (Santa Maddalena Vallalta), St. Martin-Niedertal (San Martino Valbassa), St. Martin-Obertal (San Martino Vallalta), Oberplanken (Planca di Sopra) and Unterplanken (Planca di Sotto).

History

Coat-of-arms
The emblem represents two sable scrapers placed per fess on or. It is the arms of the Knights of Gsies known from 13th century and extinct in 1429. The emblem was granted in 1968.

Society

Linguistic distribution
According to the 2011 census, 98.29% of the population speak German, 1.62% Italian and 0.09% Ladin as first language.

Demographic evolution

Sports
Gsieser-Tal-Lauf, cross-country skiing race in the Gsiesertal in South Tyrol, Italy

References

External links
  Homepage of the municipality

Municipalities of South Tyrol